Brandon Samuel McPherson (born 2 February 2002) is an English professional footballer who plays as a winger for Grimsby Town.

Career
In 2018, McPherson joined Grimsby Town's academy from Walsall. On 3 September 2019, McPherson made his debut for Grimsby in a 2–1 EFL Trophy defeat against Scunthorpe United.

Career statistics

References

2002 births
Living people
Sportspeople from Solihull
Association football wingers
English footballers
Grimsby Town F.C. players